The 24th Massachusetts General Court, consisting of the Massachusetts Senate and the Massachusetts House of Representatives, met in 1803 and 1804 during the governorship of Caleb Strong. David Cobb served as president of the Senate and Harrison Gray Otis served as speaker of the House.

Composition by party 
 Resignations and new members are discussed in the "Changes in membership" section below.

Leadership

Senate

Presiding 
 President: David Cobb (F)

House of Representatives

Presiding 
 Speaker: Harrison G. Otis (F)

Members

Senate 
The 40 seats are apportioned to each county or counties, based upon population size, to be elected at-large. 

 Barnstable
 Berkshire
 Bristol
 Cumberland
 Dukes and Nantucket
 Essex
 Hampshire
 Hancock, Lincoln and Washington
 Kennebec
 Middlesex
 Norfolk
 Plymouth
 Suffolk
 Worcester
 York

Barnstable 
 At-large. John Dillingham (DR)

Berkshire 
 At-large. John Bacon (DR)
 At-large. Barnabas Bidwell (DR)

Bristol 
 At-large. Stephen Bullock (F)  
 At-large. Alden Spooner (F)

Cumberland 
 At-large. John Cushing (DR)
 At-large. Woodbury Storer (F)

Dukes and Nantucket 
 At-large. Isaac Coffin (DR)

Essex 
 At-large. Elias H. Derby (F)
 At-large. John Heard (F)
 At-large. Nathaniel Marsh (F)  
 At-large. Benjamin Pickman (F)
 At-large. Enoch Titcomb (F)
 At-large. Dudley A. Tyng (F)

Hampshire 
 At-large. Samuel Fowler (F)
 At-large. John Hastings (F)  
 At-large. John Hooker (F)
 At-large. Ezra Starkweather (F)

Hancock, Lincoln and Washington 
 At-large. Alexander Campbell (F)  
 At-large. David Cobb (F)

Kennebeck 
 At-large. John Chandler (DR)

Middlesex 
 At-large. William Hildreth (DR)
 At-large. Aaron Hill (DR)
 At-large. William Hull (DR)
 At-large. Jonathan Maynard (DR)

Norfolk 
 At-large. John Ellis (DR)
 At-large. John Howe (DR)

Plymouth 
 At-large. Beza Hayward (F)
 At-large. Isaac Thompson (F)

Suffolk 
 At-large. John C. Jones (F)
 At-large. Jonathan Mason (F)
 At-large. David Tilden (DR) 
 At-large. William Tudor (F)
 At-large. Oliver Wendell (F)

Worcester 
 At-large. Daniel Bigelow (F)
 At-large. Elijah Brigham (F)
 At-large. Thomas Hale (F)
 At-large. Salem Towne (F)

York 
 At-large. Simon Frye (F)
 At-large. John Woodman (DR)

House of Representatives 

The members of the House of Representatives are apportioned by incorporated township and therefore the number of representatives in the House of Representatives can vary. Every incorporated township that has atleast 150 ratable polls (taxable persons) is given one representative and for every additional 225 ratable polls, another representative is given. Townships can choose not to send a representative to the House each session, therefore the total number of filled seats can fluctuate year-to-year. 

 Barnstable
 Berkshire
 Bristol
 Cumberland
 Dukes
 Essex
 Hampshire
 Hancock
 Kennebec
 Lincoln
 Middlesex
 Nantucket
 Norfolk
 Plymouth
 Suffolk
 Washington
 Worcester
 York

Barnstable 
 Barnstable. Isaiah L. Green (DR)
 Brewster. Isaac Clark
 Chatham. Richard Sears
 Falmouth. David Nye
 Harwich. Ebenezer Broadbrook
 Orleans. Richard Sparrow
 Sandwich. William Bodfish
 Yarmouth. Elisha Doane

Berkshire 
 Adams. Abraham Howland
 Cheshire. Jonathan Richardson
 Lanesborough. Gideon Wheeler (F)
 Lenox. Elijah Northrup
 Peru. Cyrus Stowell (DR)
 Pittsfield. Joshua Danforth
 Richmond. Noah Roseter
 Sandisfield. John Picket
 Stockbridge. Jonathan Patten
 Tyringham. Adonijah Bidwell
 West Stockbridge. Enoch W. Thayer (DR)
 Williamstown. William Young
 Windsor. Amos Holbrook

Bristol 
 Attleborough. Ebenezer Tyler
 Berkley. Apollos Tobey
 Dartmouth. Holder Slocum
 Dighton. George Walker
 Easton. Abiel Mitchell
 Freetown. Nathaniel Morton Jr. (DR)
 New Bedford. Benjamin Church Jr.
 Norton. Laban Wheaton (F)
 Raynham. William A. Leonard
 Rehoboth. Frederick Down
 Somerset. Francis Borland
 Swansea. Christopher Mason
 Taunton. Jones Godfrey
 Westport. Abner Brownell

Cumberland 
 Brunswick. John Durlap
 Cape Elizabeth. Mark Dyer
 Falmouth. Archelaus Lewis
 Gorham. Lothrop Lewis (F)
 Harpswell. Benjamin Dunning
 Brunswick. John Durlap
 Hebron. Samuel Paris (F)
 Lewiston. John Herrick
 Livermore. Cyrus Hamlin
 New Gloucester. Joseph E. Foxcraft
 North Yarmouth. James Prince (DR)
 Paris. Josiah Bisco
 Portland. William Symmes
 Portland. Joseph Titcomb
 Scarborough. Joseph Emerson
 Windham. Peter T. Smith

Dukes 
 Edgartown. William Mayhew
 Tisbury. Benjamin Allen

Essex 
 Amesbury. Christopher Sargent
 Andover. Thomas Kitteridge (DR)
 Beverly. Israel Thorndike (F)
 Beverly. Joseph Wood
 Boxford. Thomas Perley
 Bradford. Nathanial Thurston (F)
 Danvers. Gideon Foster
 Danvers. Samuel Page
 Gloucester. Daniel Rogers Jr. (DR)
 Hamilton. Robert Dodge
 Haverhill. Francis Carr (DR)
 Ipswich. Jonathan Cogswell
 Ipswich. Joseph Swazey
 Ipswich. Nathaniel Wade
 Lynn. Abner Cheever
 Marblehead. Richard James (DR)
 Marblehead. Nathan B. Martin (DR)
 Marblehead. Joshua Prentiss (DR)
 Marblehead. John Prince (DR)
 Methuen. William Russ
 Newbury. Josiah Little
 Newburyport. Thomas Carter
 Newburyport. Thomas M. Clark (F)
 Newburyport. Mark Fitz (F)
 Newburyport. Nicholas Johnson
 Newburyport. Jonathan Marsh
 Newburyport. Jeremiah Nelson (F)
 Rowley. Moody Spafford
 Salem. John Hathorne (DR)
 Salem. Joseph Sprague (DR)
 Salem. Jonathan Waldo (DR)
 Salisbury. Jonathan Webster
 Wenham. Samuel Blanchard

Hancock 
 Belfast. Jonathan Wilson
 Castine. Oliver Mann
 Frankfort. Abner Bicknell
 Hampden. Martin Kinsley
 Orrington. Oliver Leonard
 Penobscot. Jeremiah Wardwell
 Vinalhaven. William Vinal

Kennebec 
 Augusta. Samuel Howard
 Hallowell. Nathaniel Perley
 Pittston. Samuel Oakman
 Winthrop. Nathaniel Banks

Middlesex 
 Acton. Asa Perlin
 Billerica. James Abbot
 Cambridge. Jonathan L. Austin (DR)
 Charlestown. Matthew Bridge (DR)
 Charlestown. Thomas Harris (DR)
 Concord. Joseph Chandler
 Dracut. Israel Hildreth
 Framingham. Jonathan Maynard
 Groton. Samuel Dana (DR)
 Holliston. Ephraim Littlefield
 Hopkinton. Timothy Sheppard
 Lexington. Isaac Hastings
 Lincoln. Samuel Hoar (DR)
 Malden. Jonathan Oakes
 Malborough. John Loring
 Medford. Nathaniel Hall
 Newton. Timothy Jackson (F)
 Reading. James Bancroft
 Sherburne. Daniel Whitney
 Sudbury. Jonathan Rice
 Watertown. Jonas White
 Westford. Jonathan Carver
 Weston. John Slack
 Woburn. Loammi Baldwin (F)

Nantucket 
 Nantucket. Micajah Coffin (DR)

Norfolk 
 Bellingham. Laban Bates
 Brookline. Stephen Sharp
 Canton. Joseph Bemis
 Cohasset. Thomas Lothrop
 Dedham. Ebenezer Fisher
 Dorchester. Perez Morton (DR)
 Franklin. John Boyd
 Medfield. John Baxter
 Medway. John Ellis
 Milton. David Tucker
 Needham. Jonathan Kingsbery
 Randolph. Joseph White
 Roxbury. Crowell Hatch
 Roxbury. Joseph Heath
 Roxbury. Willian Brewer
 Stoughton. Lemuel Gay
 Walpole. William Bacon
 Weymouth. James Lovell
 Wrentham. Nathan Comstock

Plymouth 
 Abington. Aaron Hobart
 Bridgewater. Daniel Snow
 Duxbury. Seth Sprague
 Hanover. Albert Smith
 Hingham. Nathan Rice
 Kingston. Seth Drew
 Marshfield. Elisha Phillips
 Middleborough. John Tinkham
 Pembroke. Nathaniel Smith
 Plymouth. John D. Dunbar
 Rochester. Elisha Ruggles
 Scituate. Charles Turner Jr. (DR)

Suffolk 
 Boston. William Brown (F)
 Boston. Jonathan Hunnewell (F)
 Boston. John Lowell (F)
 Boston. Harrison G. Otis (F)
 Boston. Samuel Parkman (F)
 Boston. John Phillips (F)
 Boston. William Smith (F)

Washington 
 No representatives sent

York 
 Arundel. Thomas Perkins III
 Berwick. John Lord (F)
 Biddeford. Nathaniel Webster
 Kittery. Mark Adams
 Lyman. John Low
 Saco. Samuel Scammon
 Saco. Thomas G. Thornton
 Waterborough. James Carlisle
 Wells. Nathaniel Wells (F)
 York. Samuel Darby

Committees

Standing Committees

Changes in membership

Senate

Officers and officials

Senate officers 
 Chaplain: Rev. William Emerson
 Clerk: Wendell Davis

House of Representatives officers 
 Chaplian: Rev. Thomas Baldwin
 Clerk: Nicholas Tillinghast

See also
 8th United States Congress
 List of Massachusetts General Courts

Notes

References

External links
 . (Includes data for state senate and house elections in 1803)
 
 
 

Political history of Massachusetts
Massachusetts legislative sessions
massachusetts
1803 in Massachusetts
massachusetts
1804 in Massachusetts